The Secret Bond (also known as the Secret Band) was a document drawn up by Cardinal Beaton and signed by a number of Scottish peers on 24 July 1543. They agreed to resist alliance with England by the marriage of Mary, Queen of Scots to Prince Edward.

Historical context
Following the death of James V of Scotland in December 1542, his daughter, Mary, Queen of Scots, an infant of less than a week old, succeeded to the Scottish throne. A struggle for the regency between Cardinal Beaton and Earl of Arran was won by the latter. On 1 July 1543, the Earl of Arran entered into the Treaty of Greenwich with Henry VIII of England. Under the treaty, Mary was promised to Henry's son, Edward. The union of the thrones of England and Scotland which the treaty envisaged was controversial from the outset: the treaty's Anglo-centric policy was resisted by many who preferred to continue the Auld Alliance with France.

The Secret Bond
On 24 July 1543, when about to remove Mary from Linlithgow Palace to Stirling Castle, the leaders of the Scottish-French party entered into a bond drawn up by Cardinal Beaton in which they pledged themselves to resist the realm being "swbdewit till our awld enymyis of Ingland". The signatories included:
George Gordon, 4th Earl of Huntly
Archibald Campbell, 4th Earl of Argyll
Matthew Stewart, 4th Earl of Lennox
Patrick Hepburn, 3rd Earl of Bothwell
John Gordon, 11th Earl of Sutherland
William Graham, 3rd Earl of Menteith
John Erskine, 5th Lord Erskine
William Ruthven, 2nd Lord Ruthven
Malcolm Fleming, 3rd Lord Fleming
William Crichton, 5th Lord Crichton of Sanquhar
David Drummond, 2nd Lord Drummond
John Lyle, 4th Lord Lyle
George Home, 4th Lord Home
William Abernethy, 5th Lord Saltoun
Lord Lovat, The Master of Lovat
The Master of Forbes

Aftermath
In December 1543, the Treaty of Greenwich was rejected by the Parliament of Scotland. Scotland's rejection of the treaty and its pursuit of a French Alliance led to the Rough Wooing, Henry VIII's attempt to impose his matrimonial policy by force, which lasted until the Treaty of Norham in 1551.

References

16th century in Scotland
16th-century documents
Rough Wooing